Mirza Muratovic (born 14 January 2000) is an Australian professional footballer of Bosnian descent who plays as a forward for Wollongong Wolves in the National Premier Leagues.

Club career

Brisbane Roar
Muratovic was part of the 2018–19 Y-League championship winning Brisbane Roar Youth team. He played 90 minutes and scored the third goal as the Young Roar beat Western Sydney Wanderers Youth 3–1 in the 2019 Y-League Grand Final on 1 February 2019.

Muratovic made his professional debut for the Roar on 28 December 2019, playing the full game in a 1–1 draw against the Newcastle Jets at McDonald Jones Stadium.  He made a second consecutive start 4 days later, providing an assist for Bradden Inman's winner in a 2–1 victory over Western Sydney Wanderers. For his performance, he was named in the Round 13 Hyundai A-League Team of the Week. Muratovic scored his first professional goal in a Round 18 clash against Adelaide United on 8 February 2020, scoring the equaliser in an eventual 2–1 win. He scored his second goal of the season the following week, tapping home the winner in a 1–0 victory over Western United.

Wellington Phoenix
On the 10 November, it was announced that Muratovic had signed a one-year deal with Wellington Phoenix for the upcoming 2020–21 season.

Wollongong Wolves
On the 31st of October 2022,Wollongong Wolves announced that they had signed Muratovic for the upcoming NPL 2023 Season.

Career statistics

Club

Honours

Club
Brisbane Roar
Y-League: 2018–19

International
Australia U17
AFF U-16 Youth Championship: 2016

References

External links

2000 births
Living people
Australian soccer players
Association football forwards
Brisbane Roar FC players
Gold Coast Knights F.C. players
National Premier Leagues players
A-League Men players